INS Lahav (502) (translated as blade) is a  of the Israeli Navy that was built by Northrop Grumman Ship Systems in 1993. She is one of three Sa'ar 5-class corvettes in service with the Israeli Navy and her homeport is Haifa, Israel.

The contract for the construction of the three ships of the class was signed in the early 1980s. Lahav was the second ship of the class to be launched in 1993 and she was commissioned in September 1994. Lahav took part in the 2006 Lebanon War by blockading Lebanese ports. She has also taken part in numerous NATO exercises including one in April 2008 with the Turkish and American navies.

It took part in the 2010 Gaza flotilla raid.

The Israeli Navy chose Lahav as the first Sa'ar 5 corvette to be equipped with the advanced EL/M-2248 MF-STAR radar.
On 23 September 2014 she was presented to the public with the new radar at Haifa naval base.

References

External links
Eilat Class Sa'ar 5 Multi-Mission Corvettes, Israel
Israeli Navy to roll out new C2 system across fleet
Israeli Navy to begin installing Barak 8 on Sa'ar 4.5 corvettes
Israeli ship launches Barak-8 SAM for the first time

Sa'ar 5-class corvettes
1993 ships
Ships built in Pascagoula, Mississippi